The 2004 Hertsmere Borough Council election took place on 10 June 2004 to elect members of Hertsmere Borough Council in Hertfordshire, England. One third of the council was up for election and the Conservative Party stayed in overall control of the council.

After the election, the composition of the council was:
Conservative 25
Labour 7
Liberal Democrat 7

Background
Before the election the Conservatives controlled the council with 25 councillors, compared to 8 for Labour and 6 Liberal Democrats. 39 candidates stood for the 13 seats being contested, with 13 each from the Conservative and Labour parties, 12 Liberal Democrats and 1 from the Socialist Labour Party.

Election result
The Conservative party remained on 25 seats, after both gaining and losing 2 seats. Labour finished 1 down on 7 seats, to be level with the Liberal Democrats for the first time, after the Liberal Democrats picked up a seat.

The Conservative gains from Labour came in Borehamwood Hillside where they won by 235 votes and in the former Labour stronghold of Borehamwood Brookmeadow, which had been held by Tim Sandle since 1995 (the area had been subject to a recent boundary change, with the main Labur voting part of the ward being reallocated to Cowley ward). Labour did take one seat back from the Conservatives in Borehamwood Cowley Hill by 87 votes, after the sitting Conservative councillor for Cowley Hill, Martin Heywood, contested and held Potters Bar Oakmere instead with a 709-vote majority for the Conservatives. Meanwhile, the Liberal Democrats picked up a seat from the Conservatives in Bushey St James by 59 votes.

Following the election the Labour and Liberal Democrat parties shared the main opposition role as both parties were on the same number of seats. Meanwhile, Labour chose a new leader, Leon Reefe, after Len Silverstone stood down as leader of the group.

Ward results

References

2004 English local elections
2004
2000s in Hertfordshire